Brazil is 21st on the all time medal table in Summer Universiade. Brazil hasn't won any medal in Winter Universiade.

Medal count

Summer Universiade

     Host nation

Winter Universiade

Medals by sport

See also 
Brazil at the Olympics
Brazil at the Paralympics
Brazil at the Pan American Games

References

External links
 FISU History at the FISU

 
Nations at the Universiade
Student sport in Brazil